Lang is an extinct town in Carroll County, in the U.S. state of Georgia.

History
A post office called Lang was established in 1887, and remained in operation until 1896. Benjamin F. Lang, an early postmaster, gave the community his last name.

References

Geography of Carroll County, Georgia
Ghost towns in Georgia (U.S. state)